Thomas Little (1886–1985) was a Hollywood set decorator.

Thomas Little may also refer to:

 Thomas Little, pseudonym of publisher John Joseph Stockdale
Thomas Little (Windsor MP), British Member of Parliament for Windsor
Sir Frank Little (bishop) (Thomas Francis Little, 1925–2008), Roman Catholic Archbishop of Melbourne
Thomas Shepherd Little, British Member of Parliament for Whitehaven
Tom Little (optometrist) (died 2010), American optometrist killed in Afghanistan
Tom Little (cartoonist) (1898–1972), Pulitzer Prize–winning editorial cartoonist
 Tommy Little (footballer, born 1872) (1872–?), Scottish footballer for Barnsley, Derby County, Luton Town and Manchester City
 Tommy Little (footballer, born 1890) (1890–1927), English footballer for Bradford Park Avenue and Stoke
 Tommy Little (comedian), Australian comedian, writer, actor, and presenter

See also
 Thomas Little Shell (died 1901), chief of the Ojibwa tribe of indigenous Americans
 Sir Thomas Little Heath (1861–1940), British civil servant, mathematician, classical scholar